Dmitriy Nalbandyan (September 15, 1906 in Tiflis – July 2, 1993 in Moscow) was a Soviet Armenian painter, People's Artist of the USSR (1969), member of the USSR Academy of Arts (1953), Hero of Socialist Labor (1976), twice winner of the Stalin Prize (1946, 1951).

References 

Энциклопедия фонда "Хайазг" - Налбандян Дмитрий Аркадьевич

1906 births
Artists from Tbilisi
Full Members of the USSR Academy of Arts
Heroes of Socialist Labour
Stalin Prize winners
Socialist realist artists
1993 deaths
Soviet painters